Bademağacı is a village on the north part of Antalya, Turkey. It is near the Antalya-Burdur main road. It is 50 km far from Antalya centrum and 4 km far from Cubukbeli.

Leadership 
Its mayor is Mustafa Yıldız from Justice and Development Party.

Archeological sites 
Bademağacı is an important archeological area. A group of archeologists from Istanbul University have made archeological explorations.

References 

Towns in Turkey